Jieznas Manor was an historic manor house in Jieznas, Lithuania Only the workshop with a former kitchen, laundry room and servants room remains now.

References

Manor houses in Lithuania
Classicism architecture in Lithuania